A. J. Pat Harris is a former association football player who represented New Zealand at international level.

Harris played five official full internationals for New Zealand, making his debut in a 7–0 win over South Africa on 28 June 1947, his final cap earned in a 1–8 loss to Australia on 11 August 1948.

References

External links
 

Year of birth missing (living people)
Living people
New Zealand association footballers
New Zealand international footballers
Waterside Karori players
Association football defenders